Brigo is a surname. Notable people with the surname include:

 Damiano Brigo (born 1966), Italian applied mathematician
  (born 1973), Italian basketball player
 Juan Brigo, Argentine field hockey player